And Suddenly the Dawn is a 2017 Chilean drama film directed by Silvio Caiozzi. It was selected as the Chilean entry for the Best Foreign Language Film at the 91st Academy Awards, but it was not nominated. It won Grand Prix des Amériques, the main prize at the Montreal World Film Festival in 2017.

Plot
The movie tells the story of Pancho Veloso (Jung), a writer who flees his hometown in Chiloé and settles in Santiago de Chile, devoting his life to tabloid journalism. After 45 years, he returns to his hometown to create stories set in the area, inspired by the plot of the movie.

Cast
 Julio Jung as Pancho Veloso
 Sergio Hernández as Miguel
 Magdalena Müller as Rosita
 Arnaldo Berríos as Luciano
 Pablo Schwarz as young Luciano
 Diego Pizarro as  young Miguel
 Ana Reeves as Doña Maruja
 Neddiel Muñoz Millalonco as Viuda del Griego
 Darko Alexandar as El Griego
 Pedro Vicuña as El Duende
 Nelson Brodt as Pancho's father
 Aldo Parodi as Don Teodoro
 Agustín Moya as Mayor

See also
 List of submissions to the 91st Academy Awards for Best Foreign Language Film
 List of Chilean submissions for the Academy Award for Best Foreign Language Film

References

External links
 

2017 films
2017 drama films
2010s Spanish-language films
Chilean drama films
2010s Chilean films